A gun moll or gangster moll or gangster's moll is the female companion of a male professional criminal. "Gun" was British slang for thief, derived from Yiddish ganef, from the Hebrew gannāb (גנב). "Moll" is also used as a euphemism for a woman prostitute.

Prominent gun molls

Prominent, true-life gun molls (and the men they were associated with) include:

 Beulah Baird – Charles "Pretty Boy" Floyd
 Mae Capone – Al Capone
 Dee David (née DaLonne Chisam; 1923–1976 – later Cooper, Brumer & Jackson, through four marriages) – Associated with Frank Niccoli (alias Frankie Burns) (1910–1949), Mickey Cohen and Fred (Alfred Gerardo) Sica (1915–1987) Dee David was an aspiring actress, playing bit-parts in several movies, such as the hat check girl in Alias a Gentleman (billed as DaLonne David), and the uncredited role of Rita (the "Blonde") in the detective thriller Calling Homicide (billed as Dalonne Cooper).
 Jean Delaney (Crompton) – Tommy Carroll
 Phoolan Devi – Indian dacoit, gun moll of Vikram Mallah, later turned into the gang leader after his death
 Victoria DiGiorgio Gotti – John Gotti
 Judith Exner – an American woman who claimed to be the mistress of U.S. president John F. Kennedy and of Mafia leaders Sam Giancana and John Roselli
 Evelyn "Billie" Frechette – John Dillinger
 Buda Godman (née Helen Julia Godman; 1888–1945) – John Homer T. ("Dapper Jackie") French, member of the Lou Blonger Gang of Denver. A photo of Buda holding a gun is found in Philip S. Van Cise's Fighting the Underworld.
 Catherine Greig – James Whitey Bulger
 Maria Victoria Henao – Pablo Escobar
 Karen Hill – Henry Hill
 Virginia Hill – Bugsy Siegel
 Mary Kinder (née Mary Northern; 1909–1981) – Harry Pierpont
 Opal "Mack Truck" Long – Russell Clark
 Edna Murray – wife of "Diamond Joe" Sullivan, who was executed for murder in 1924. She then married Jack Murray, who was imprisoned for 25 years in 1925. She then lived with Volney Davis, until they were both arrested for kidnapping in 1935. 
 Mary O'Dare – Raymond Hamilton
 Bonnie Parker – Clyde Barrow
 Geraldine "Geri" McGee Rosenthal – Frank Rosenthal
 Kathryn Thorne (née Cleo May Brooks; 1904–1985) – George "Machine Gun" Kelly
 Helen Gillis (née Wawzynak; 1908–1987) – George "Baby Face" Nelson
 Kiki Roberts - Legs Diamond

See also
 Femme fatale
 Moll (Australian slang)
 Pachucas
 Ride-or-die chick
 Nightclub singer

References

External links
 

Organized crime members by role
Organized crime-related lists
Yiddish words and phrases
Slang terms for women
Female organized crime figures